Yamdrok Lake (also known as Yamdrok Yumtso or Yamzho Yumco;) is a freshwater lake in Tibet, it is one of the three largest sacred lakes in Tibet. The lake is surrounded by many snow-capped mountains and is fed by numerous small streams. The lake has an outlet stream at its far western end and means turquoise in English due to its color.

According to local mythology, Yamdok Yumtso lake is the transformation of a goddess.

The Yamdrok Hydropower Station was completed and dedicated in 1996 near the small village of Baidi at the lake's western end. This power station is the largest in Tibet.

Physical data

The mountainous lakeshore is highly crenellated, with numerous bays and inlets. Lake Yamdrok freezes in winter.

Climate

Yamdrok Lake has a cold steppe climate (BSk) with long, cold, very dry winters and short, cool, wet summers. It is also bordering on an alpine tundra climate (ET) and on a subarctic climate (Dwc). The differences between day and night are great.

Cultural significance

Like mountains, lakes are considered sacred by Tibetan people, the principle being that they are the dwelling places of protective deities and therefore invested with special spiritual powers. Yamdrok Lake is one of four particularly holy lakes, thought to be divinatory; everyone from the Dalai Lama to local villagers makes pilgrimages there.  It is considered sacred as one of the four "Great Wrathful Lakes" guarded by the goddess Dorje Gegkyi Tso.  The others such lakes are Lhamo La-tso, Namtso and Manasarovar. The lake is revered as a talisman and is said to be part of the life-spirit of Tibet. The largest lake in southern Tibet, it is said that if its waters dry, Tibet will no longer be habitable.

The lake, its islands, and the surrounding area are closely associated with Padmasambhava, the Second Buddha, who brought Buddhism to Tibet in eighth century AD.  The lake is home to the famous Samding Monastery which is on a peninsula jutting into the lake. This monastery is the only Tibetan monastery to be headed by a female re-incarnation. Since it is not a nunnery, its female abbot heads a community of about thirty monks and nuns. Samding Monastery is where Samding Dorje Phagmo, the most important female incarnate Lama in Tibet, stayed and presided, and stands to the south of Lake Yamdrok Yumtso.

Today, both pilgrims and tourists can be seen walking along the lake's perimeter. One of the lake's islands contains an old fort or castle called Pede Dzong.

Economic significance

There are shoals of fish living in Yamdrok Lake, which are commercially exploited by local population. From April to October, fish caught from this lake are sold at markets in Lhasa, Tibet's capital.

Additionally, the lake's islands serve as rich pasture land to local herdsmen.

References

External links
Yamdrok Tso Campaign Pack Death of a Sacred Lake
TWS Campaign for 'Endangered Tibet'
National Aeronautics and Space Administration
Diary of Yamdrok Tso Hydroelectric Project The Government of Tibet in Exile
Chris Travel Blog Tibet Yamdrok Lake Experience

Lakes of Tibet
Sacred lakes